The Market Street Historic District is a  historic district located along Market Street in the downtown area of the city of Salem in Salem County, New Jersey, United States. It was added to the National Register of Historic Places on April 10, 1975, for its significance in architecture, art, commerce, industry, military history, religion, social history, and transportation. The district includes 44 contributing buildings.

History and description
The Old Salem County Courthouse, located at the corner of Broadway and Market streets, was first built in 1735, and later enlarged in 1817 and 1908. It is a 2  story brick building using Flemish bond and features a cupola and a portico with Doric columns. The Johnson House was built in 1807 by Robert Gibbon Johnson, a gentleman farmer. It was moved from its original site to 90 Market Street in 1966. The 3 story brick Ford's Hotel, also known as the Fenwick Building, at 87 Market Street, features Queen Anne revival style. The First Presbyterian Church was built in 1856 and has a  central spire.

See also
National Register of Historic Places listings in Salem County, New Jersey

References

External links

HABS Salem, NJ

Salem, New Jersey
Georgian architecture in New Jersey
Federal architecture in New Jersey
National Register of Historic Places in Salem County, New Jersey
Historic districts in Salem County, New Jersey
Historic districts on the National Register of Historic Places in New Jersey
New Jersey Register of Historic Places